Cureau if a French surname. It may refer to 

 Guillaume Cureau (c. 1595–1648), French painter.
 Marin Cureau de la Chambre 1594–1669), French physician and philosopher
 Pierre Cureau de La Chambre (1640–1693), French churchman
 Cureau, minor planet named after Marin Cureau de la Chambre